Tarff railway station served the village of Ringford, Dumfries and Galloway, Scotland from 1864 to 1965 on the Kirkcudbright Railway.

History 
The station opened on 7 March 1864 as Tarff for Gatehouse by the Glasgow and South Western Railway. To the east was the goods yard and to the north was the signal box, which opened in 1882. The goods yard had a siding and a stone goods shed. The name of the station was changed to Gatehouse on 1 September 1865 and then changed to Tarff on 1 August 1871. The signal box closed in 1946 and was replaced by ground frames. The station closed to both passengers and goods traffic on 3 May 1965.

References

External links 

Disused railway stations in Dumfries and Galloway
Railway stations in Great Britain opened in 1864
Railway stations in Great Britain closed in 1965
1864 establishments in Scotland
1965 disestablishments in Scotland
Beeching closures in Scotland
Former Glasgow and South Western Railway stations